Sartono Anwar (born 3 September 1947 in Semarang) is a former Indonesian footballer who is a football coach. He managed Persisam Putra Samarinda since September 2012.

History
The man has given his life to the green grass field since many years ago. In fact, she was willing to leave an established life: salary and bonuses in Pertamina orderly and clear work schedule. Everything he left behind after the ball and putting green. Although the world of football often bring frustration, "I can not escape from football. I was ready to be disappointed," said Sartono while fixing his hat. Anwar diving sartono his world patiently. For him, the days football was a fun day. Such that morning, after giving a training session, Sartono mingle with the players. He chatted with the players on the sidelines and locker rooms. It is a way of maintaining closeness with his team Sartono. Football career was the father of seven children beginning at age 13 years. When the young Sartono joined the club Sport Supaya Sehat (SSS), a local club in the city of Semarang. Sartono talent round leather processing decreased from M. Anwar, who is also the father of a football player in PS POP Semarang.

Careers
Football career was the father of seven children beginning at age 13 years. When the young Sartono joined the club Sport Supaya Sehat (SSS), a local club in the city of Semarang. Sartono talent round leather processing decreased from M. Anwar, who is also the father of a football player in PS POP Semarang.

"In addition to often see my dad play ball, as a child I often brought the ball PSIS just so I can go watch PSIS play," he recalls. For Sartono, a good football coach does not have a former national team player. He named Benny Dollo and Daniel Roekito are some examples of good coaches who do not have a background as a national team players like him. After joining the PS SSS, his talent as a midfielder being honed after joining in Training and Education Center Salatiga in 1962-1966. After that, for two years, Sartono straight into the PSIS Semarang squad. Sartono of the school's career skyrocketed to join the PSIS. He was right. His salary as coach training Salatiga then Rp 50 thousand per month. This number doubled his salary as an employee of Pertamina. For the Semarang football public, Sartono is legend. In addition to ever strengthen the team in the 1970s, coaches cap is identical to the first time successfully delivering Mahesha jenar, nicknames PSIS Semarang, a Perserikatan champions beat Persebaya in 1987. Semarang society miss celebrating a similar victory party. Celebrated their last victory in 1999.

Finally, in 1972, decided to retire Sartono. In the same year, he received as an employee of Pertamina Distribution Pengapon Semarang. However, he felt his soul can not be separated from football. While working at Pertamina, he became goalkeeper coach PSIS-school boy soccer PSIS that time-until 1975. After that, 1975-1976, he coached PSIS. Sartono may fail as a player, but, as a coach, including a successful career.

At 1976-1978, Wiel Coerver, the national team coach, Sartono appointed as coach Diklat Salatiga. Being a coach in training camp is quite prestigious at that time. Training is to be churning out some of the current national players. Frequent pacing Semarang-Salatiga turned out to be its own record for Pertamina leader Sartono work place. Ultimatum came. Sartono must choose to be employees of Pertamina or coach. Sartono answer the ultimatum to get out of the spot Pertamina.

Since then, the father of ex-national team player and Persib Bandung's Nova Arianto, a career as a football coach until now. In addition to training Salatiga and PSIS, a club he ever was a team arsiteki PON Central Java, Jakarta PS UMS (Galatama), BPD Central Java (Galatama), Assyabaab Salim Group, Petrokimia Putra, Arseto Solo, Putra Samarinda, Persegi Gianyar, Persibas Banyumas, Persedikab Kediri, Persikab Bandung, PSIS Semarang, Persibo Bojonegoro, Persisam Putra Samarinda.
For the national team, the father of seven children in 1982 was an assistant coach Sinyo Aliandoe, which handles the national team. At 1984-1992, Sartono became assistant coach Indonesia A and Benny Dolo became head coach Indonesia B with as an assistant coach. In 2002, Sartono believed to be the coach of the national futsal team.

Honours 
PSIS Semarang
Perserikatan champions (1): 1987

References 

1947 births
Living people
Indonesian football managers
Indonesian footballers
Indonesia Super League managers
PSIS Semarang players
People from Semarang
Association football midfielders
Sportspeople from Central Java